Iron Lake is a lake located east of Powley Place, New York. Fish species present in the lake are brook trout, and sunfish. There is trail access along the east shore.

In media
Dexter: New Blood is set in a fictional upstate New York town named Iron Lake.

References

Lakes of New York (state)
Lakes of Hamilton County, New York